Enkhbold Togmidshiirev (Mongolian: Тогмидшийрэвын Энхболд) is a Mongolian contemporary artist known for his use of "organic materials such as horse dung, ash, rust, leather and wood" in his conceptual performances.

Life and career 
Enkhbold was born in 1978 in Övörkhangai Province (Mongolian: Өвөрхангай аймаг), Mongolia and grew up in a nomadic family. His interest in the arts started from an early age when he began wood carving with the encouragement of his parents. In 1998, he moved to the capital city and enrolled at Setgemj College of Design and Technology, Ulaanbaatar, Mongolia. Soon after, Enkhbold transferred to the Institute of Fine Art, Ulaanbaatar, Mongolia graduating in 2005. He studied under Enkhbat Lantuu, an abstract painter, who advocated for Enkbold's inclination to step outside the traditional medium of painting and to experiment with other artistic forms such as installation art, which was the first in his cirriculum. Enkhbold Togmidshiirev is "a member of the Blue Sun Group. Founded in 2002 the Blue Sun Group is an artists group that aims to support emerging artists and alternative art practices". In 2016, he won the "Best Artwork of the Year" from Mongolian National Gallery of Modern Art.

Notable exhibitions

Solo exhibitions 
2016   Mining, at Art Space 976+, Ulaanbaatar, Mongolia

Group exhibitions 
2018   2nd Yinchuan Biennale, at Yinchuan Contemporary Art Museum, China

2016   Land Art Mongolia - 4th Biennial, Ulaanbaatar, Mongolia

2015   Lost Children of Heaven, at Art Space 976+, Ulaanbaatar, Mongolia

2015   Asia Triennial Manchester, at Manchester Museum, UK

2015   Other Home, at Mongolia Pavilion in La Biennale di Venezia, Venice, Italy

2012   Shanghai Biennale, Shanghai, China

References

External links 

 https://976artgallery.com/enkhbold-togmidshiirev/
https://www.youtube.com/watch?v=bKAHiQjLSI0

1978 births
Living people
21st-century Mongolian artists